Hagen is a hamlet in the Canadian province of Saskatchewan.

The Royal Canadian Air Force RCAF constructed a Relief Aerodrome near the town sometime before or during the early years of the Second World War. Information on this aerodrome can be found in the article Hagen Aerodrome.

Demographics 

References

Birch Hills No. 460, Saskatchewan
Designated places in Saskatchewan
Organized hamlets in Saskatchewan
Division No. 15, Saskatchewan